Love Hina is a manga series written and illustrated by Ken Akamatsu. The series was originally serialized in Weekly Shōnen Magazine, premiering in the October 21, 1998 issue and running weekly until its conclusion with chapter 118 in the October 31, 2001 issue. The individual chapters were collected and published in 14 tankōbon volumes by Kodansha, with the first volume released on March 17, 1999 and the last released on January 17, 2002. The manga was also later released in Japan in a partially colored format known as "Iro Hina version" (literally "Color Hina version") at an increased price. In November 2010, all 14 volumes of Love Hina were offered for free in the beta test of Ken Akamatsu's J-Comi website. Kodansha has also published a bilingual (English and Japanese) edition under its Kodansha Bilingual Comics label, with the English translation provided by Giles Murray. Eight volumes were produced under the bilingual format. Kodansha stopped publishing the bilingual version in 2001.

The series is licensed for an English language release in North America and the United Kingdom by Tokyopop, which released the 14 volumes between May 7, 2002 and September 16, 2003. The English release was one of Tokyopop's first releases in the "Authentic Manga" lineup of titles using the Japanese right to left reading style.  In doing so the artwork remained unchanged from the original. The series has appeared consistently in Tokyopop's top five selling manga and has been reprinted several times. In August 2009, it was revealed that Tokyopop's license had been left to expire by Kodansha and would not be renewed. Kodansha USA, Kodansha's American division re-released the manga in a five-volume omnibus format with a new translation from October 25, 2011 to March 26, 2013. It is also licensed for an English language release in Singapore by Chuang Yi and for regional language releases in France and Québec by Pika Édition, in Spain by Glénat, in Singapore by Chuang Yi, in Brazil by Editora JBC, in Mexico by Grupo Editorial Vid, in Poland by Waneko, in Greece by Compupress, in Germany by Egmont Manga & Anime, in Sweden by Bonnier Carlsen, and in Norway by Schibsted Forlagene.



Volume list

References 

Chapters
Love Hina